A cat registry or cat breed registry, also known as a cat fancier organization, cattery federation, or cat breeders' association, is an organization that registers domestic cats (usually purebred) of many breeds, for exhibition and for breeding lineage tracking purposes. A cat registry stores the pedigrees (genealogies) of cats, cattery names, and other details of cats; studbooks (lists of authorized studs of recognized breeds), breed descriptions, and the formal breed standards (a.k.a. standards of points or SoP); lists of judges qualified to judge at shows run by or affiliated with that registry, and sometimes other information. A cat registry is not the same as a breed club or breed society (these are specific-breed organizations that may be affiliated with one or more registries with whom they have lodged breed standards in order to be able to exhibit under the auspices of that registry). Cat registries each have their own rules and usually also organize or license (sanction) cat shows. The show procedures vary widely, and awards won in one registry are not normally recognized by another. Some registries only serve breeders, while others are oriented toward pet owners and provide individual as well as cattery memberships, while yet others are federations only deal with breed clubs or even other registries as intermediaries between the organization and breeders.

History
The first cat registry was the National Cat Club, set up in 1887 in England. Until the formation of the Governing Council of the Cat Fancy in 1910, the National Cat Club was also the governing body of the cat fancy. A rival registry called the Cat Club was set up in 1898, but foundered in 1903 and was replaced by the [British] Cat Fanciers' Association. Cats could only be registered with one or the other registry. These two fancies merged in 1910 and became the GCCF.

In the United States, the 1899 Chicago cat show resulted in the formation of the Chicago Cat Club, followed by the better-organized Beresford Cat Club (named after noted British breeder Lady Marcus Beresford). In 1906, the Beresford Cat Club renamed itself the American Cat Association (ACA) and rapidly became the dominant North American registry for a short time. In 1908, the [American, and extant] Cat Fanciers' Association (CFA) split off, and both organizations continue to the present, with competition from The International Cat Association (TICA), also US-based, as well as more regional associations. ACA today accepts Canadian and Mexican as well as US registrations but remains primarily active in the northeastern United States. Both TICA and CFA are international, though the bulk of their pedigrees are issued to US breeders.

In the intervening years, many cat registries have been formed worldwide. These range from international organizations or federations to national registries in one particular country. In many countries, independent registries have also been formed which may or may not be recognized by the main registries.

The internationally broadest organisation is the Fédération Internationale Féline (FIFe, founded 1949 in Paris, and presently based in Belgium), which is a worldwide federation of member cat registries, with a large European and South American presence. The World Cat Federation (WCF, founded 1988 in Rio de Janeiro, presently based in Germany), has a strong presence in Latin America, throughout Western Europe, and in countries of the former USSR. It is organized on a similar basis to FIFe but has a much more permissive approach to new breed acceptance. Like CFA, WCF provides a cattery registration service (to "reserve" cattery names and prevent others from using conflicting ones).

While some cat registries forbid the practice, it is now common to allow a cat to be registered by more than one registry. The World Cat Congress (WCC) is an international coordinating organization of the largest cat registries. WCC operates an "open-door" policy by which cats registered with one WCC registry can be shown under the rules of another WCC registry. Going further, the World Cat Federation, a WCC member accepts half again as many breeds as it publishes standards for, because it accepting the standards of TICA, FIFe, and several other WCC-affiliated federations, though it has also produced some nomenclatural conflicts with some of them.

Some independent cat registries specialize in particular types of cats that are ineligible for registration with a major registry due to breed restrictions or certain genetic traits. For example, The Dwarf Cat Association recognizes breeds derived from the short-legged Munchkin (a cat body type genetic mutation) which are banned by FIFe and some other registries. The Rare and Exotic Feline Registry specializes in cats derived from (or alleged to derive from)  hybridization with wildcat species.

Recognition levels
Most registries offer several levels of recognition (often called registers). The actual designations differ between registries, but typically these are:

 Full a breed that competes for championship titles at shows organized by, or affiliated to, that registry
 Provisional/Preliminary the level of recognition of cat breeds until they demonstrate that they breed true to their registered standards; there may be several levels of provisional/preliminary recognition e.g. new or advanced as numbers and popularity increase
 Experimental a provisional register for breeds in development; this may be separate from the provisional/preliminary register in some cat fancies
 Exhibition only a new trait, new import or minority variety that does not compete, but is exhibited in order to attract opinion and/or potential breeders
 Registration only status means cats of that breed can be registered, but do not have permission to be exhibited.

Not all breeds achieve full (championship) status.

In breeds known to carry recessive genes (e.g. long-haired cats born from short-haired parents, colorpoint cats born from non-colorpoint parents), cats that do not meet their breed standard might be registered as variants or they might be registered under a different breed name. These may sometimes be used to maintain a good gene pool, but not exhibited in championship classes for the parents' breed.

A genetic register is used by some registries for breeds where a genetic test is required before cats can be bred. Cats that have not been cleared through testing remain on the genetic register unless negative test results are provided. There may also be active and inactive registers that denote whether a cat legitimately may be used in breeding and its offspring registered.

A cat registry is at liberty to refuse to accept breeds if it feels the breed is not genetically sound; does not breed true to the standard put forward by the developer(s) of the breed (with allowances made for known variants); is not represented in sufficient numbers or is not sufficiently distinct from breeds already recognized by the registry. It may also expel breeders who do not conform to accepted standards of behavior and ethics, with the result that their cats may be disqualified from its shows.

The rules as to what constitutes a new breed vary from registry to registry. The International Cat Association (TICA) is a relatively progressive registry that will recognize breeds derived from crossing existing breeds; mutations of an existing breed; naturally occurring breeds indigenous to a geographical location; a breed already recognized by a different registry; and experimental breeds that do not yet have a TICA-approved breed name. FIFe will register some new breeds imported from other registries but have set procedures for these breeds to gain full recognition. The GCCF is a more conservative registry and recognizes new color variations of an existing breed, but do not usually recognise other mutations of an existing breed e.g. spontaneous rexed fur, and is slow to accept new breeds. CFA takes a similar resistant approach, and has a position statement discouraging most attempts at new breed formation or even new coat colour patterns.

What constitutes a breed at all also varies widely between registries. Some "permissive" organisations recognise as separate breeds what most "conservative" registries would consider several coat variants of the same breed. For example, the WCF treats all long-haired and short-haired variants as distinct breeds, and both WCF and CFA recognize a Colourpoint Shorthair breed that others consider a Siamese cat with non-standard colouration. Similarly, the Cymric is recognized as a breed in some registries, considered under that name as a sub-breed of the Manx in some, called simply the Manx Longhair or Longhair Manx in others, and not recognized at all by a few. Registries may also use different names for the same breed, and the WCF has even been known to assign breed names that conflict with those other registries (i.e. are applied to completely different breeds). Various registries includes breeds not recognized (yet) by any others, either due to differences in relative progressiveness toward breed introduction and establishment, or due to geographical proximity to breeds unknown in other parts of the world.

Breed numbers, acronyms and codes
Registries allocate a breed number, acronym or a Code to the breeds they register. Most use a two or 3 letter acronym e.g. MK (Munchkin), JBT (Japanese Bobtail). This may be followed by numbers or lower case acronyms that indicate colour and pattern, these being subdivisions of the breed. For historical reasons, the British GCCF allocate numbers to breeds and the Black Persian Longhair is registered under a different breed number, and effectively as a different breed, to the Blue Persian Longhair. These lists may be found on individual registry websites (or in their printed publications where they do not yet have a website). All FIFe Member cat registries use the EMS (Easy Memory System) breed and variety code which consists of a breed abbreviation followed by pattern and colour letters and digits which are consistent across all breeds.

Where a breed is already recognised by another registry, it is becoming increasingly common to adopt an existing acronym (with the possible addition or subtraction of a letter) in order to avoid clashes and confusion. Where 2 breeds with different characteristics have the same name, it is usual to prefix the name with the country/area of origin e.g. in the US the "Burmese" and "European Burmese" are different breeds with different conformation. In the UK, "Burmese" refers to the European form as the "American Burmese" is not recognised.

A single breed may have 2 different breed names in different countries. In Britain, a cat of Persian type with the colourpoint pattern is called a Colourpoint Persian. In the USA it is called a Himalayan. The American-bred Serengeti was founded in 1992 by Karen Sausaman from Oriental x Bengal crosses to resemble the wild cats of the Serengeti plains but without the introduction of wild cat blood. In Britain, a Bengal x Siamese cross was originally called the Savannah, but was later renamed Serengeti because of an existing American breed called the Savannah. The American-bred Savannah resembles the Serval and the first generation cross is Serval x domestic.

Where colours have been added to a breed through outcrossing to another breed, not all registries accept the new colours under the original breed name e.g. Chocolate Persians and Lilac Persians may be recognised under the name "Kashmir" as the two colors were introduced through crossing to Siamese cats during the development of the Colourpoint Persian (UK) and Himalayan (USA).

List of registries and related organizations

World co-ordinating body
World Cat Congress (WCC) – does not issue breed standards

International
Cat Fanciers' Association (CFA) – over 67,000 breeders/catteries registered (not all are active members); over 2 mil. registered cats; about 400 shows per year; 600 clubs; 42 recognised breeds ( describes itself as "the largest registry of pedigreed cats"
Fédération Internationale Féline (FIFe) – over 100,000 individual members, 3,000 cattery members, and 110,000 pedigrees (involving entire litters; over 200,000 cats are shown annually at FIFe events); 43 organisations (plus 1 provisional) in 41 countries; over 700 shows per year; 48 recognised breeds ( describes itself as "the United Nations of cat federations" and "a leading international cat fancier society"
The International Cat Association (TICA) – over 3,000 individual members; about 200 shows per year; over 200 clubs; 75 recognised breeds ( describes itself as "the world's largest genetic registry of pedigreed cats, and the world's largest registry of household pets"
World Cat Federation (WCF) – over 10,000 breeders/catteries registered (not all are active members); 66 national organisations (plus 64 provisional); 370 clubs (over 500 counting sub-clubs) total pedigrees unknown (handled by clubs, not centralised); average of over 500 shows per year; 89 recognised breeds ( describes itself as "an international association of cat clubs ... working on the development of animal protection laws"

National

American Cat Fanciers Association (ACFA)
Australian Cat Federation (ACF)
Emirates Feline Federation (EFF) – UAE
Governing Council of the Cat Fancy (GCCF) – UK
Chats Canada Cats (CCC) - Canada
Cat Aficionado Association (CAA) – China (shares the ACFA standards)
Canadian Cat Association/Association Féline Canadienne (CCA-AFC)
Southern Africa Cat Council (SACC or TSACC)

Notes and references

 Simpson, Frances. 1903. The Book of the Cat.
 Winslow, Helen M. 1900. Concerning Cats.

External links
 Cat Registries And Cat Clubs - A Broad Definition

 
Breed registries